The Mississauga Transitway is a bus rapid transit (BRT) system in Mississauga, Ontario, Canada. It comprises a series of purpose-constructed bus-only roadways, as well as reserved lanes on existing city streets and portions of Highway 403, that together form a continuous  route spanning most of the city from Winston Churchill Boulevard in the west to the junction of Highways 401 and 427 in the east on the border with Toronto. Service on the Transitway is provided by MiWay and GO Transit, with some stations providing connections to Brampton Transit and Toronto Transit Commission (TTC) bus services.

Originally proposed in the 1970s, the Mississauga Transit plan has evolved over time. At least eighteen studies were made between 1970 and 1992. In the 1990s, a serious proposal intended to build a "transitway" from Ridgeway Drive at the very western edge of the city; this was eventually revised to its current state, with construction beginning in November 2010. The first stretch of the present Transitway opened between Hurontario Street and Dixie Road on November 17, 2014. Other remaining sections faced delays, and were open in stages until the eastern terminus, Renforth, was opened on November 22, 2017. There were plans to eventually extend Transitway service to a new regional bus terminal at the Kipling subway station in southern Etobicoke, which came to fruition with the opening of the terminal on January 4, 2021.

Design and operation
The Mississauga Transitway consists of two busways and bus-priority lanes. The western busway segment parallels Highway 403 from the western terminus at Winston Churchill Boulevard to Erin Mills Parkway. From there, buses use dedicated shoulder lanes on Highway 403 and Centre View Drive to reach MiWay's City Centre Transit Terminal on Rathburn Road. The longer eastern busway begins east of Hurontario Street, paralleling Highway 403 to Cawthra Road and then following Eastgate Parkway on its north and west side to Eglinton Avenue, and Eglinton on its north side to the eastern terminus at Renforth Drive at the boundary with Toronto.

Bus services along the Mississauga Transitway operate similarly to that of the Ottawa Transitway network, using a mixture of express and local routes that call at intermediate stations constructed along the route. Because the Transitway does not directly connect to any major transit hubs other than the City Centre Terminal, all routes that use the Transitway travel in mixed traffic to reach other outlying termini such as Kipling subway station.

The Transitway is shared by MiWay standard and articulated buses for intra-city travel, along with GO Transit-operated highway coaches and double-decker buses along inter-city routes. MiWay buses operating along the Transitway stop at all stations by request, while GO Transit routes only make stops at Winston Churchill, Erin Mills, Dixie, and Renforth stations (depending on the route).

Funding and construction
The Transitway project, estimated to cost $259 million, was funded as part of the Government of Ontario's MoveOntario 2020 plan, with both the federal and provincial governments contributing up to a total of $173 million. Construction responsibilities were divided between Metrolinx and the City of Mississauga: Metrolinx was responsible for the western segment between Winston Churchill and Erin Mills, a portion of the eastern segment between Hurontario and Cawthra, and Renforth Station; while the city was responsible for all other stations and segments. Construction on the eastern segment began in November 2010, while Metrolinx launched construction of the western segment in November 2013.

Including construction, land, design and bus acquisition, Mississauga’s cost was at least $328 million. Metrolinx 's cost was over $200 million. The federal government contributed $83 million, bringing the total to approximately $611 million.

Routes using the transitway

MiWay
With the opening of the first phase on November 17, 2014, MiWay adjusted three of its routes to use the eastern section of the corridor, with service initially operating Monday to Saturday from 4:30 AM to 10:30 PM. A fourth route, 110 University, began using the Transitway lanes on Highway 403 on September 7, 2015, with the opening of Erin Mills station, which is the only Transitway station served by this route.

On January 8, 2017, with the opening of the new Winston Churchill station, new Sunday service was implemented on 109 Meadowvale Express, expanding service along the full length of the Mississauga Transitway to 7 days a week.

GO Transit
Current GO Transit bus routes that use the Transitway include the following:

Stations
There are twelve stations along the transitway. Those along the BRT portion of the route are accessed by street entrances, with Kiss & Ride areas at most stations and Park & Ride lots at selected stations. All stations are wheelchair-accessible, have heated waiting areas, and similar to the Züm service operated by Brampton Transit, loading platforms designed for level boarding. Transitway stations are unstaffed and the bus platforms are not fare-paid zones. Fare payment is done when boarding buses as with on-street routes, and either tapping a Presto card or a paper transfer is required for connecting between buses.

The following is a list of stations, from west to east:

A multi-modal interchange with the western extension of the TTC's Line 5 Eglinton is currently under construction at Renforth station. A later phase will terminate at the nearby Pearson International Airport. Originally proposed in 2007 under the city of Toronto's Transit City plan, the first phase of Line 5 will open as far west as Mount Dennis station at Weston Road in 2023, with the extension to Renforth being slated to open circa 2030.

The original plans for the connection featured a full-service below grade BRT station, but only an at-grade median surface stop for the LRT, requiring transferring passengers to cross Commerce Boulevard and descend a set of stairs to access the BRT. As of 2020 however, in an addendum to the Line 5 extension, the addendum showed the future Renforth LRT station partially at-grade and the station located off-street on the north side of Eglinton, north of the transitway terminal.

Ridership

Criticism 
Due to the bankruptcy of contractor B. Gottardo, some stations were not complete 2 years after officially opening.

Gil Peñalosa, a  former business analyst Mississauga, considered the Transitway's location a mistake. "It should have been built along Burnamthorpe, the heart of the city.”

Looking at the Erin Mills station, Amar Shubhanan Lad  comments that "Pedestrian and cycling connections in particular are poor, inaccessible and uninviting to try." Lad also found that a previously existing pedestrian shortcut to the station had been closed at local resident's request.

See also

 Public transport in Canada

Notes

References

External links
 
Mississauga Bus Rapid Transit (BRT)
Mississauga MiWay and GO Transit Route and Stations
BRT Detailed Design Concept Plans
BRT Detail Design - Winston Churchill to Erin Mills Parkway (DRAFT)
 BRT Detail Design - Hurontario to Cawthra
BRT Design Plan - Eastgate Pkwy - Cawthra to Fieldgate Section
BRT Detail Design - Fieldgate to Renforth

 
The Big Move projects
Bus rapid transit in Canada
Transport infrastructure completed in 2017
Busways
2014 establishments in Ontario